Kentucky Route 480 (KY 480) is a  state highway in Kentucky that runs from Kentucky Route 61 in southern Shepherdsville to Kentucky Route 523 in rural Nelson County southeast of Mt. Washington via Cedar Grove.

Major intersections

Kentucky Route 480C

Kentucky Route 480C (KY 480C) is a  state highway in Shepherdsville, Bullitt County, Kentucky that serves as a connector route for Kentucky Route 480. It runs from Kentucky Route 61 to Kentucky Route 480 in southern Shepherdsville.

Major intersections

References

0480
Transportation in Bullitt County, Kentucky
Transportation in Nelson County, Kentucky